The Tucker Seamount is a seamount located in the Pacific Ocean off the coast of northern Vancouver Island, British Columbia, Canada.

See also
Volcanism of Canada
Volcanism of Western Canada
List of volcanoes in Canada

References
British Columbia Marine Topography

Seamounts of the Pacific Ocean
Volcanoes of British Columbia
Seamounts of Canada